Sunday is a computer virus (program file virus), a member of the Jerusalem virus family.  It was discovered in November 1989  after a number of simultaneous reports from Seattle, Washington, United States, and surrounding areas. Several other Seattle outbreaks, including AirCop, were later traced to Asia.

Infection
Sunday is a standard patched Jerusalem variant in the way it infects files. It is a type of program file virus. It is a directly modified version of the original Jerusalem.1803. It infects .EXE, .COM, and  files.  Like the original Jerusalem, infected files occasionally become corrupted.

Symptoms
Sunday is less easily identified than the original Jerusalem, in part because of corrected errors and in part because its payload is poorly written and fails to execute.

COM and EXE files increase by size. COM files increase by a set amount, while EXE files increase by somewhere between that amount and 9 or 10 bytes less.  Unlike the original Jerusalem, files will not be infected many times.
Interrupt 21 will be hooked.
Infected files will contain the string "Today is SunDay! Why do you work so hard? All work and no play make you a dull boy! Come on! Let's go out and have some fun!"

The capitalization of "Sunday" is reported variously as "Sunday" or "SunDay", and may depend on the variant.

Because of an error in coding, the virus fails to execute its payload, intended to set off on Sundays of every year other than 1989.  This is to print the previously indicated text on the screen and then delete all files run while the virus is memory resident, as the original Jerusalem did every Friday the 13th.

Prevalence
The WildList, an organisation tracking computer viruses, listed Sunday as spreading in various forms from shortly after the list was started until 1998.  Like all DOS viruses, Sunday suffered with the debut of Windows.  It is now considered obsolete, although the virus was common enough that the use of previously dormant files has resulted in recent infections.  However, anything other than a localised outbreak is unlikely.

References

DOS file viruses